Derick Snow is an American voice actor. Inspired by the work of other actors, Snow eventually began a career in acting in 2000. In 2014, he began voice acting in anime. Some of his noteworthy roles include Hermes in Kino's Journey, Shinra Kusakabe in Fire Force, Ikuto Tsumura in Smile Down the Runway, and Nagara in Sonny Boy.

Biography
Snow was born in Missouri on August 25 and grew up in Utqiagvik, Alaska. While growing up, Snow was a fan of voice actor Noel Blanc. In 2000, Snow began performing in various musical theater performances. In order to combine these passions, Snow later decided to move to Dallas, an area he had previously done commercial work in. In 2016, Snow began voice acting in anime with his first role being Kei Kamatori in No-Rin.

Filmography

Anime

Films

References

External links
 
 

21st-century American male actors
American male voice actors
Living people
Male actors from Alaska
Male actors from Missouri
People from Utqiagvik, Alaska
Year of birth missing (living people)